Tuleutai Suleimenov served as the Ambassador of Kazakhstan to the European Union in 2003. He previously served as the ambassador to the United States from 1994 to 1996.

References

Ambassadors of Kazakhstan to the United States
Ambassadors of Kazakhstan to the European Union
Kazakhstani diplomats
Living people
Year of birth missing (living people)